The Valea Porumbenilor (also: Trestenic) is a right tributary of the river Câlniștea in Romania. It discharges into the Câlniștea near Naipu.

References

Rivers of Romania
Rivers of Giurgiu County